Crash is the second studio album by American rock group Dave Matthews Band, released on April 30, 1996.

By March 16, 2000, the album had sold seven million copies, and was certified 7× platinum by the RIAA. This is currently Dave Matthews Band's best-selling album.

Recording
Recording of the album began in October 1995, and ended in January 1996. There were only four known songs from the Crash sessions that "didn't make it to the final cut." However, none of the titles are known.

Critical reception

Q described Crash as "equal parts originality and willful complication", and stated, "Although the band's determinedly jammy methods do lead them away from their songs at times, almost every track of Crash is at least 'good in parts'". Entertainment Weeklys Tom Sinclair praised the band's technical abilities, concluding that "one of the nicest things about DMB's music is that its distinctive complexity serves as a virtual assurance against a flood of lame imitator bands."

Jim DeRogatis of Rolling Stone was less favorable and deemed Matthews' vocals "too much like Sting's at times" and his lyrics "typically banal", while remarking that the album's musical eclecticism "gives Matthews a slight edge over his peers, but that's sort of like saying you prefer vanilla ice cream to vanilla frozen yogurt." Robert Christgau of The Village Voice evaluated Crash as a "dud".

Track listing

Personnel

Dave Matthews Band
Carter Beauford – drums, percussion, backing vocals (1, 7, 10, 11, 12)
Stefan Lessard – bass, tack piano
Dave Matthews – vocals, acoustic guitar, design assistant
LeRoi Moore – saxophones, flute, whistles
Boyd Tinsley – electric and acoustic violins

Additional musicians
Tim Reynolds – acoustic and electric guitars

Technical personnel
 Steve Lillywhite – production, mixing engineer (3, 5, 6, 8, 10, 12)
 John Siket – engineer
 Chris Laidlaw – 1st assistant engineer
 Scott Gormley – 1st assistant engineer
 Paul Higgins – 2nd assistant engineer
 Phil Painson – additional recording assistant
 Tom Lord-Alge – mixing engineer (1, 2, 4, 7, 9, 11)
 Alex Case – mixing assistant (1, 2, 4, 7, 9, 11)
 John Alagía – additional preproduction
 Ted Jensen – mastering engineer
 Thane Kerner – art direction, design, illustrations
 Jane Matthews – design assistant
 C. Taylor Crothers – Band photography

Charts

Weekly charts

Year-end charts

Certifications

References

1996 albums
Albums produced by Steve Lillywhite
Dave Matthews Band albums
RCA Records albums